Life on Earth is an album by Canadian jazz pianist  Renee Rosnes which was released in 2001 by Blue Note Records. It won the 2003 Juno Award for Traditional Jazz Album of the Year.

References 

2001 albums
Juno Award-winning albums
Blue Note Records albums
Renee Rosnes albums